Surya Narayan Yadav may refer to:
Surya Narayan Yadav (Nepali politician), member of the Federal Parliament (2017–2019)
Surya Narayan Yadav (Indian politician), member of Lok Sabha (1989–1996)